Verena refers to Saint Verena, a 3rd to 4th century saint venerated in Switzerland. 
It may also refer to:

Given name
Verena Wagner Lafferentz (1920–2019), granddaughter of composer Richard Wagner
Verena von Weymarn (born 1943), retired German medical officer and first woman general in German military history
Verena Diener (born 1949), Swiss politician
Verena Becker (born 1952), West German terrorist
Verena "Vreni" Schneider (born 1964), Swiss alpine skier
Verena von Strenge (born 1975), dancer
Verena Bentele (born 1982), blind German Paralympic biathlete and cross-country skier
Verena Rehm (born 1984), singer
Verena Sailer (born 1985), German sprinter
Verena Stuffer (born 1984), Italian alpine skier
Verena Eberhardt (born 1994), Austrian racing cyclist
Verena Butalikakis (1955–2018), German politician
Verena Hubertz (born 1987), German politician

Fictional characters:
Verena Cardoni, a federal police officer in O Mecanismo
Verena Tarrant, the protagonist in Henry James' novel The Bostonians

Places
Monte Verena, a mountain in Italy
St. Verena, monastic church of Rot an der Rot Abbey

See also
Varina (disambiguation)
Vreneli (gold coin)